Pearblossom may refer to:

 Life Blood (film), a 2009 vampire film which began production under the working title Pearblossom
 Pearblossom, California, an unincorporated town in Los Angeles County, California, U.S.
 The flowers of a pear tree

See also
 Pearblossom Highway, California State Route 138
 Pearblossom Highway #2, a photocollage by David Hockney
 Pear Blossom Run, an annual run/walk event in Medford, Oregon, U.S.